{{DISPLAYTITLE:C19H27NO4}}
The molecular formula C19H27NO4 (molar mass: 333.42 g/mol, exact mass: 333.1940 u) may refer to:

 Drotebanol (Oxymethebanol)
 alpha-Eucaine
 Oreobeiline